Ulrich "Uli" Sutor (born 9 May 1960) is a former German curler and curling coach.

He is a former European men's curling champion, German men's curling champion (1989) and two-time German mixed curling champion (1989, 1990, silver in 1988, bronze in 1987).

Awards and honours
Collie Campbell Memorial Award: 1986.

Teams

Men's

Mixed

Record as a coach of national teams

References

External links
 

1960 births
Living people
German male curlers
European curling champions
German curling champions
German curling coaches